Francis Joseph Sheeran (October 25, 1920 – December 14, 2003), also known as "The Irishman", was an American labor union official and enforcer for Jimmy Hoffa and Russell Bufalino. He was accused of having links to the Pittston crime family in his capacity as a high-ranking official in the International Brotherhood of Teamsters (IBT), the president of Local 326.

Sheeran was a leading figure involved in the infiltration of unions by organized crime in the 1960s and 70s. In 1980, he was convicted of labor racketeering and sentenced to 32 years in prison, of which he served 13 years. Shortly before his death in 2003, he claimed to have killed Teamster leader Jimmy Hoffa in 1975. Author Charles Brandt detailed what Sheeran told him about Hoffa in the narrative nonfiction work I Heard You Paint Houses (2004). The truthfulness of the book, including Sheeran's confessions to killing Hoffa and Joe Gallo, has been disputed by some. The book is the basis for the 2019 film The Irishman directed by Martin Scorsese which starred Robert De Niro as Sheeran, Al Pacino as Hoffa, and Joe Pesci as Russell Bufalino.

Early life
Sheeran was born and raised in Darby, Pennsylvania, a small working-class borough on the outskirts of Philadelphia. He was the son of Thomas Francis Sheeran Jr. and Mary Agnes Hanson. His father was of Irish descent, while his mother was of Swedish descent. Frequently his dad would make him fight him with boxing gloves.

World War II
Sheeran enlisted in the United States Army in August 1941, completed basic training near Biloxi, Mississippi, and was assigned to the military police. Following the attack on Pearl Harbor, he volunteered for training in the Airborne at Fort Benning, Georgia, but he dislocated his shoulder and was transferred to the 45th Infantry Division, known as "The Thunderbirds" and "The Killer Division". On July 14, 1943, he set sail for North Africa.

Sheeran served 411 days of combat duty—a significant length of time, as the average was around 100 days. His first experience of combat was during the Italian Campaign, including the invasion of Sicily, the Salerno landings, and the Anzio Campaign. He then served in the landings in southern France and the invasion of Germany.

Sheeran said:
All in all, I had fifty days lost under AWOL—absent without leave—mostly spent drinking red wine and chasing Italian, French, and German women. However, I was never AWOL when my outfit was going back to the front lines. If you were AWOL when your unit was going back into combat you might as well keep going because one of your own officers would blow you away and they didn't even have to say it was the Germans. That's desertion in the face of the enemy.

War crimes
Sheeran recalled his war service as the time when he developed a callousness to taking human life. He claimed to have participated in numerous massacres and summary executions of German POWs, acts which violated the Hague Conventions of 1899 and 1907 and the 1929 Geneva Convention on POWs. In interviews with Charles Brandt, he divided such massacres into four categories:
 Revenge killings in the heat of battle. Sheeran told Brandt that a German soldier had just killed his close friends and then tried to surrender, but he chose to "send him to hell, too". He described often witnessing similar behavior by fellow G.I.s.
 Orders from unit commanders during a mission. Sheeran described his first murder for organized crime: "It was just like when an officer would tell you to take a couple of German prisoners back behind the line and for you to 'hurry back'. You did what you had to do."
 The Dachau reprisals and other reprisal killings of Nazi concentration camp guards and trustee inmates.
 Calculated attempts to dehumanize and degrade German POWs. Sheeran's unit was climbing the Harz Mountains when they came upon a Wehrmacht mule train carrying food and drink up the mountainside. The female cooks were allowed to leave unmolested, then Sheeran and his fellow GIs "ate what we wanted and soiled the rest with our waste". Then the Wehrmacht mule drivers were given shovels and ordered to "dig their own shallow graves". Sheeran joked that they did so without complaint, likely hoping that he and his buddies would change their minds. But the mule drivers were shot and buried in the holes they had dug. Sheeran explained that by then, he "had no hesitation in doing what I had to do."

Discharge and post-war
Sheeran was discharged from the army on October 24, 1945. He later recalled that it was "a day before my twenty-fifth birthday, but only according to the calendar." Upon returning from his army service, Sheeran married Mary Leddy, an Irish immigrant. The couple had three daughters, MaryAnne, Dolores, and Peggy, but divorced in 1968. Sheeran then married Irene Gray, with whom he had one daughter, Connie. Irene died in December 1995.

Organized crime and the Teamsters Union
When he left the service, Sheeran became a driver for Food Fair and he met Russell Bufalino in 1955 when Bufalino offered to help him fix his truck, and later worked jobs driving him around and making deliveries. Sheeran also operated out of a bar located in Sharon Hill, Pennsylvania which was run by Bill Distanisloa, a soldier for Angelo Bruno.

According to his biography, Sheeran's first murder was killing Whispers DiTullio, a gangster who had hired him to destroy the Cadillac Linen Service in Delaware for $10,000. However, Sheeran did not know that Angelo Bruno had a large stake in the linen service. Sheeran was spotted outside the business and was brought in for questioning. Bufalino had convinced Bruno to spare Sheeran but he ordered Sheeran to kill DiTullio as retribution. Sheeran was also suspected of the murder of Joe Gallo at Umberto's Clam House on April 7, 1972.

Bufalino introduced Sheeran to Teamsters International President Jimmy Hoffa. According to Sheeran, Hoffa became a close friend and used Sheeran for muscle, including the assassination of disloyal union members and members of rival unions threatening the Teamsters' turf. Sheeran claimed that in the first conversation he had with Hoffa over the phone, Hoffa started by saying, "I heard you paint houses" — mob code for "I heard you kill people" (the "paint" being spattered blood). Sheeran later became acting president of Local 326 of the Teamsters Union in Wilmington, Delaware.

Sheeran was charged in 1972 with the 1967 murder of Robert DeGeorge, who was killed in a shootout in front of Local 107 headquarters. However, the case was dismissed on the grounds that Sheeran had been denied a speedy trial. He was also alleged to have conspired to murder Francis J. Marino, a Philadelphia labor organizer, in 1976, and Frederick John Gawronski, who was killed the same year in a tavern in New Castle, Delaware.

Prison and death
Sheeran was indicted along with six others in July 1980, on charges involving his links to the labor leasing businesses controlled by Eugene Boffa Sr. of Hackensack, New Jersey. On October 31, 1980, Sheeran was found guilty of 11 charges of labor racketeering. He was sentenced to a 32-year prison term and served 13 years.

Sheeran died of cancer on December 14, 2003, aged 83, in a nursing home in West Chester, Pennsylvania. He was buried at Holy Cross Cemetery in Yeadon, Pennsylvania.

Hoffa death 
Charles Brandt writes in I Heard You Paint Houses (2004) that Sheeran confessed to killing Hoffa. According to Brandt's account, Chuckie O'Brien drove Sheeran, Hoffa, and fellow mobster Salvatore Briguglio to a house in Metro Detroit. O'Brien and Briguglio drove off and Sheeran and Hoffa went into the house, where Sheeran claims that he shot Hoffa twice in the back of the head. Sheeran says that he was told that Hoffa was cremated after the murder. Sheeran also confessed to reporters that he murdered Hoffa, as well as Gallo. Bill Tonelli disputes the book's truthfulness in a Slate article, as does Harvard Law School professor Jack Goldsmith in The New York Review of Books.

The FBI have examined evidence which could connect Sheeran to the murder of Hoffa, including testing remnants of blood and floorboards from the house where Hoffa was reputedly killed using the latest advances in forensic technology. Although bloodstains were found in the Detroit house where Sheeran claimed that the murder happened, they were determined not to match Hoffa's DNA.

Biographical film
The book is the basis for the 2019 film The Irishman directed by Martin Scorsese. Scorsese was long interested in directing a film about Sheeran's life and his alleged involvement in the slaying of Hoffa. Steven Zaillian is the screenwriter, and producer Robert De Niro portrays Sheeran, Al Pacino plays Hoffa, and Joe Pesci plays Bufalino. The film premiered at the New York Film Festival on September 27, 2019, and was released on November 1, 2019. Digital streaming started on November 27, 2019, via Netflix.

References

External links

 

1920 births
2003 deaths
United States Army personnel of World War II
American mass murderers
American gangsters of Irish descent
American gangsters
American people of Swedish descent
American trade union officials convicted of crimes
American trade unionists of Irish descent
Bufalino crime family
Burials in Pennsylvania
Deaths from cancer in Pennsylvania
International Brotherhood of Teamsters people
Mafia hitmen
Military personnel from Pennsylvania
Gangsters from Philadelphia
Organized crime memoirists
People from Darby, Pennsylvania
Perpetrators of World War II prisoner of war massacres
Trade unionists from Pennsylvania
American truck drivers
United States Army soldiers